Cucumberfish is a common name for several fish and may refer to:

 the family Paraulopidae, in particular the species Paraulopus nigripinnis
 the Australian grayling, Prototroctes maraena
 the New Zealand smelt, Retropinna retropinna
 the bivalve pearlfish, Onuxodon margaritiferae